Sajjad Mardani (born 1 July 1988 in Shahrekord, Iran) is an Iranian taekwondo practitioner, he won the silver medal in the men's heavyweight class at the 2013 World Taekwondo Championships held in Puebla, Mexico.

Sajjad Mardani has also been on the world's top 5 (+ 80 kg) taekwondo weight since 2013, always and annually.

References

Iranian male taekwondo practitioners
1986 births
Living people
Taekwondo practitioners at the 2014 Asian Games
Taekwondo practitioners at the 2016 Summer Olympics
Asian Games competitors for Iran
Olympic taekwondo practitioners of Iran
World Taekwondo Championships medalists
Asian Taekwondo Championships medalists
20th-century Iranian people
21st-century Iranian people